Binoy Majumdar (17 September 1934 – 11 December 2006) was a Bengali poet. Binoy received the Sahitya Akademi Award in 2005.

Biography
Binoy Majumdar was born in Myanmar (erstwhile Burma) on 17 September 1934. His family later moved to what is now Thakurnagar West Bengal in India. Binoy loved mathematics from his early youth. He completed 'Intermediate' (pre-University) from the Presidency College of the University of Calcutta. Although he graduated with a degree in mechanical engineering graduate from Bengal Engineering College, now renamed Indian Institute of Engineering Science & Technology, (IIT) Calcutta, in 1957, Binoy turned to poetry later in life.  He translated a number of science texts from the Russian to Bengali. When Binoy took to writing, the scientific training of systematic observation and enquiry of objects found a place, quite naturally, in his poetry. His first book of verse was Nakshatrer Aloy (in the light of the stars). However, Binoy Majumdar's most famous piece of work to date is Phire Esho, Chaka (Come back, O Wheel, 1960), which was written in the format of a diary. The book is dedicated to Gayatri Chakravorty Spivak, a fellow-Calcuttan and contemporary of Majumdar. Professor Narayan Ch Ghosh has written number of articles on the writings of Binoy Majumder analysing mathematical aspects of Binoy's poems. According to Ghosh Phire Esho, Chaka(Come back, O Wheel) published during 1960 was reflection of Binoy's mind for recalling progress - wheel symbolizes. Professor Ghosh had described 'Balmikir Kabita' of Binoy Majumder was continuation of Ratnakar Balmiki (first poet) through 'Balmikir Pratibha' by Rabindranath Thakur. Ghosh stated that Binoy's poem 'Eka Eka Katha Bali'is a Lyrics to Lonely Talk like a vision of poetic melancholy by John Milton Or like 'Teach me half the gladness/That thy brain must know;/Such harmonious madness/ From my lips would flow,/The world should listen then, as I am listening now' by Percy Bysshe Shelley. Though he knew his predecessor Bankim Chandra, first successful Novelist in Bengali - Binoy's mother tongue, had written 'Keo Kakhno Eka Thakiona' (No one lives alone).

Hungry Generation 

During the 1960s, he had joined the Hungry generation movement for a short time but departed because of differences with its leader Shakti Chattopadhyay. However, he had published several poems in the Hungryalist bulletins and one of them viz., 'Ekti Ujwal Maach' became quite famous and popular among academicians. After his disagreement with Shakti Chattopadhyay and Sandipan Chattopadhyay, he had himself written a Hungryalist broadside against them. He was supportive of Malay Roy Choudhury during his 35-month-long trial.

Binoy died in his maternal home in Shimulpur, Thakaurnagar, West Bengal, on 11 December 2006.

His work
The book, Phire Esho, Chaka, opens with the lines:

The period from 1958 to 1962 saw Binoy's poetry thrive. Apart from Phire Esho, Chaka, he wrote other books, such as:  Nakshatrer Aaloy (In the light of the stars), Eeshwariyo (Godly), Adhikantu (Excessive), Aghraaner Anubhutimala (The emotions of the month of Aghran), Balmikir Kabita (The Poetry of Balmiki). An anthology of Binoy's poems was published by Dey's Publishing House of Calcutta under the name Binoy Majumdarer Srestho Kabita (Selected Poems of Binoy Majumdar) in 1981.

Binoy's poetry has been appreciated by literary critics. He won several awards such as 
Rabindra Puraskar, 
Sudhindranath Dutta Puraskar, 
Krittibas Puraskar etc., and the most notable award being the 
Sahitya Academy Award in 2005, just a year before his death.

In the 1980s and 1990s, Binoy was affected by severe mental illness. He tried to commit suicide several times, and stopped writing poetry altogether. Also, the medical treatment he received was inadequate. He moved to the outskirts of Calcutta, in Thakurnagar, and lived with local town folks, a stranger amidst strangers.

Binoy had passed into obscurity in his later years, suffered from senility and lived in social seclusion and neglect. He did not have a family.

Binoy Majumdar died on 11 December 2006, at the age of 72.

Poetic legacy
Binoy has often been regarded by critics as a true successor of Jibanananda Das, the poet who revolutionized Bengali Poetry in the post-Tagore era. Like Jibanananda, Binoy drew his material from bountiful nature, the fields and the jungles and the rivers and the fauna of Bengal. But Binoy's originality lay in his attempt to relate the various elements of nature to one another through objective logic and scientific enquiry. In this respect, some critics like Aryanil Mukhopadhyay, refer to the genre of his work as scientific field journal. Binoy Majumdar was bold and revolutionary in the depiction of sexuality in Poetry. He abundantly used vivid imagery which were sensually potent and Freudian in essence. In a series of pieces (Aamar Bhuttay Tel etc.), where he gives an explicit and graphic description of sexual intercourse, Binoy, once again, lays strong emphasis on the physiology of the process, and takes to a journalistic narration. Binoy was one of the original participants in the Hungry generation হাংরি আন্দোলন literary movement spearheaded by Shakti Chattopadhyay, Samir Roychoudhury and Malay Roy Choudhury.

Binoy has always been somewhat obscure among readers of Bengali Poetry. He was quite ahead of his time in breaking norms of contemporary literature. Some of his poems are difficult to decipher at the first go, and require multiple readings. His writings are unconventional because they often appear as neutral scientific reportage, and not poetry in its usual romanticized self. In this, Binoy readers can perhaps trace back his background as a Mathematician. Binoy builds up all his imagery, nuances, lyricism, and poetic discovery on the skeleton of scientific reasoning and factual observations.

Binoy Majumer has used mathematical concepts in his poetry. Legacy is, usually poets avoid mathematics; and therefore, he was not properly understood by the Begali poets and Binoy was not most popular one, though exceptional. During last few years Professor Narayan Ch Ghosh, mathematician, has analysed his poems from mathematical stand point. He has written number of articles in different journals. Those extraordinary writings have opened a new window for assessment of Binoy from different point. Now revaluation has started.

Awards 
Binoy is awarded two big literary awarded some years ago before his death.

He is awarded Rabindra Puraskar for his Kabyasamgra 2 ( 2nd Poem collection) in 2005. He is also awarded Sahitya Akdemi Award for Haspatale Lekha Kabitaguchha ( Poetry written in hospital) in 2005.

See also

Subimal Basak
Tridib Mitra
Basudeb Dasgupta
Anil Karanjai

References

External links
Binay Majumdar's poetry in translation at Kaurab

1934 births
2006 deaths
20th-century Bengali poets
Bengali writers
Recipients of the Sahitya Akademi Award in Bengali
Writers from West Bengal
University of Calcutta alumni
Hungry generation
20th-century Indian poets
Bengali male poets
Indian male poets
Poets from West Bengal
20th-century Indian male writers